Rodents of Unusual Size is a 2017 documentary film funded by ITVS and directed by the team of Quinn Costello, Chris Metzler and Jeff Springer about giant invasive swamp rats, nutria, threatening coastal Louisiana.  The film is narrated by Wendell Pierce with an all original musical soundtrack by the Cajun band Lost Bayou Ramblers.

This feature-length film premiered during the 2017 version of the all documentary film festival DOC NYC, on 15 November 2017.

The film was released by Grasshopper Film and broadcast on the PBS TV series Independent Lens on 14 January 2019.

Synopsis

Louisiana residents south of New Orleans have faced many an environmental threat, from oil spills to devastating hurricanes, but a growing problem are an invasive species known as nutria or colloquially called swamp rats in the region.

This invasive species from South America is accelerating erosion of the state's coastal wetlands, already one of the largest disappearing landmasses in the world.

The film covers the people (trappers, chefs, fashion designers, exotic pet enthusiasts) who have lived in the area for generations and are fighting back in creative ways. The film winds up being a joyful take on an ecological menace while revealing, in equal parts, human beings' impact on the environment and the local communities' surprising solutions to save their land before it disappears.

Through the offbeat and unexpected stories of the people confronting the nutria problem, Rodents of Unusual Size examines issues surrounding coastal erosion, the devastation surrounding hurricanes, loss of culture and homeland, and the resilience of the human spirit.

Reception
 
On Metacritic it has a weighted average score of 65 out of 100, based on 8 reviews, indicating "generally favorable reviews".

References

External links
 
 
 

American documentary films

Documentary films about Louisiana
Documentary films about United States history
2017 documentary films
2017 films
2010s English-language films
2010s American films